K. R. Vatsala is an Indian actress who works in Malayalam cinema.

Filmography

Malayalam
Ottayaal Pattaalam (1992) as Cabaret dancer
Kallanum Policum (1992) as Housewife
Kudumbasametham (1992) as Housewife
Maarathon (Aayaraam Gayaaraam) (1992)
Midhunam (1993) as Renuka
Ithu Manjukalam (1993) as Elizabeth
Thenmavin Kombath (1994) as Karthumbi's sister
Boxer (1995) as Comedy
Aksharam (1995) as Subhadra
Sakshyam (1995) as Nambiar's aunt
Kalamasseriyil Kalyanayogam (1995) as Ambika
Kusruthikattu (1995) as Home maker
Mangalam Veettil Manaseswari Gupta (1995) as Housewife
Achan Rajavu Appan Jethavu (1995)
Kattile Thadi Thevarude Aana (1995)
Puthukkottayile Puthumanavaalan (1995)
Aramana Veedum Anjoorekkarum (1995)
Thumbolikadappuram (1995)
The King (1995)
K.L. 7/95 Ernakulam North (1995) as Sherly
Aayiram Navulla Ananthan (1996) as Nurse
Sathyabhamakku Oru Premalekhanam (1996)as Chandrasekara Varma's Wife
Kinnam Katta Kallan (1996) 
Oru Mutham Mani Mutham (1997) as Savithri
Vamsham (1997) as Sharadha Mathew
Oru Yathramozhi (1997)
Ancharakalyanam (1997)
Shibiram (1997)
Chenchaayam (2001)
Desam (2002)
Maniyarakallan (2005) as Kasthuri's mother
Narakasuran (2006)

Tamil
 Kalam Vellum (1970) as Child artist
 Sundara Kandam (1992)
 Subash (1996) as Nithyananda Swamy's assistant
 Dharma Chakkaram (1997) as Kannukku Pula's wife
 Arunachalam (1997)
 Kadhalukku Mariyadhai (1997)
 Dhinamum Ennai Gavani (1997)
 Putham Puthu Poove (1997)
 Kalyana Galatta (1998)
 Ponmanam (1998)
 Kondattam (1998)
 Ini Ellam Sugame (1998)
 Color Kanavugal (1998)
 Harichandra (1998)
 Thulladha Manamum Thullum (1999) as Mani's wife
 Suyamvaram (1999) as Kanna's mother
 Annan Thangachi(1999) as Bhaskar's mother
 Sundari Neeyum Sundaran Naanum (1999) as Mani Megalai
 Kaama (1999) as Rich lady
 Ootty (1999)
 Ennavale (2000)
 Simmasanam (2000)
 Veeranadai (2000)
 Devi Durga Shakti (2001)
 Sri Raja Rajeshwari (2001)
 Maayan (2001)
 Krishna Krishna (2001)
 Dheena (2001) as Malarvannan's wife 
 Lovely (2001) as Chandru's mother
 Citizen (2001) as Devasakayam's wife
 Jollyman (2001)
 Padai Veetu Amman (2002)
 Junior Senior (2002)
 Red (2002) as School Principal
 Pathikichi (2003)
 Military (2003)
 Vayasu Pasanga (2004) as Seethalakshmi
 Ippadikku Kadhaludan Seenu  (2004) 
 London (2005)
 47A Besant Nagar Varai (2006)
 Adavadi (2007) as Chandini's mother
 Vasool (2008) as Jinda's mother
 Netru Pol Indru Illai  (2009) as Rahul's mother
 Puthumugam (2010) as Srija
 Suvadugal (2013)

Telugu
 Sarppayaagam (1992)

Hindi
 Saat Rang Ke Sapne (1998) as Jalima's sister

Television
 Thendral as Thilaga, Velayudham's sister 2009–2010
 Gokulathil Seethai 2009-2010
  Vanthaana Thanthaana
 Selvi
 Arasi as Ganga's mother 2007,2009
 Thirumathi Selvam as Bhagyam 2007–2008
 Manaivi 2004-2005
 Raja Rajeswari 2004-2005
 Soolam  2001-2002
 Kadhal Pagadai as Akhalya 1996 -1998
Kaathirukka Oruthi
 Premi1997
 Oviyam 
 Manaivi
 Puthumugam
 Manithargal

References

External links

 K. R. Vatsala at MSI

Living people
Actresses from Chennai
Actresses from Thiruvananthapuram
Actresses in Malayalam cinema
Indian film actresses
Actresses in Tamil cinema
Actresses in Telugu cinema
Actresses in Hindi cinema
20th-century Indian actresses
21st-century Indian actresses
1962 births